The East Coast Main Line (ECML) is a  electrified railway between its southern terminus at London King's Cross station and  via , , , ,  and Newcastle. The line is a key transport artery on the eastern side of Great Britain running broadly parallel to the A1 road. In addition, a few ECML services extend beyond Edinburgh to serve , although the principal London-Glasgow route is the West Coast Main Line (WCML).

The line was built during the 1840s by three railway companies, the North British Railway, the North Eastern Railway, and the Great Northern Railway. In 1923, the Railway Act of 1921 led to their amalgamation to form the London and North Eastern Railway (LNER) and the line became its primary route. The LNER competed with the London, Midland and Scottish Railway (LMS) for long-distance passenger traffic between London and Scotland. The LNER's chief mechanical engineer Nigel Gresley designed iconic Pacific steam locomotives including Flying Scotsman and Mallard, the latter of which achieved a world record speed for a steam locomotive,  on the Grantham-to-Peterborough section.

In 1948, the railways were nationalised and operated by British Railways. With the demand for higher speed, British Rail introduced InterCity 125 high-speed trains between 1976 and 1981. In the 1980s, the line was electrified and InterCity 225 trains introduced. These have in turn been largely replaced by Class 800 and Class 801 units.

The line links London, South East England, East Anglia and the East Midlands, with Yorkshire, the North East and Scotland, and is important to their local economies. It carries commuter traffic in north London as well as cross-country, commuter and local passenger services, and freight. There is currently no electrification north of Edinburgh to Aberdeen or Inverness. In 1997, operations were privatised. The primary long-distance operator is London North Eastern Railway, but open-access competition on services to Northern England and Scotland is provided by Hull Trains, Grand Central and Lumo.

Route definition and description
The ECML is part of Network Rail's Strategic Route G which comprises five separate lines:

The line crosses the Anglo-Scottish border at Marshall Meadows Bay;
 The branch line to 

The core route is the main line between King's Cross and Edinburgh, the Hertford Loop is used for local and freight services and the Northern City Line provides an inner suburban service to the city. The line has engineers line references (ELR) ECM1 to ECM9.

History

Origins and early operations
The ECML was constructed by three independent railway companies. During the 1830s and 1840s, each company built part of the route to serve its own area, but also intending to link with other railways to form the through route that would become the East Coast Main Line. From north to south, the companies were:

 the North British Railway (NBR), from Edinburgh to Berwick-upon-Tweed, completed in 1846.
 the North Eastern Railway (NER) from Berwick-upon-Tweed to Shaftholme.
 the Great Northern Railway (GNR) from Shaftholme to King's Cross, completed in 1850.
 
The GNR established an end-on connection with the NER at Askern, famously described by the GNR's chairman as in "a ploughed field four miles north of Doncaster". Askern was connected to the Lancashire and Yorkshire Railway, a short section of which was used to reach the NER at Knottingley. In 1871, the line was shortened when the NER opened a direct line from an end-on junction, with the GNR, at Shaftholme, just south of Askern to Selby and over Selby Bridge on the Leeds-Hull line  direct to York.

Through journeys were important and lucrative for the companies and in 1860 they built special rolling stock for the line. Services were operated using  "East Coast Joint Stock" until 1922. The trains were hauled by GNR locomotives between King's Cross and York, which entailed utilisation of GNR running powers over the NER between Shaftholme Junction and York (which had been agreed in 1849 and exercised from the opening of the GNR in 1850); and by NER locomotives between York and Edinburgh, using NER running powers over the NBR between Berwick and Edinburgh (agreed in 1862 but not exercised until 1869).

LNER era
The entire ECML came under control of the London and North Eastern Railway (LNER) in 1923, under the Railway Act of 1921 which 'grouped' many small railway companies into four large ones. The LNER was the second largest railway company in Britain, its routes were located to the north and east of London. 

The LNER appointed Nigel Gresley (who was knighted in 1937) as its Chief Mechanical Engineer, and under his tenure, Pacific steam locomotives were developed as the standard express locomotive to work the line, several of which became famous, these included the Class A3, including 4472 Flying Scotsman, and the later Class A4, including 4468 Mallard. During this time Mallard set a new world-record speed for a steam locomotive (see ).

Races to the North

The East Coast Main Line was engaged in long running rivalry with the West Coast Main Line (WCML), the other main trunk route between London and Scotland. At various points in the late 19th century, highly publicised but unofficial races occurred between express trains on the two routes, most notably in 1888 and 1895. These races were ended over concerns over safety, but later the rivalry resumed in the 1920s and 1930s as both the LNER and its West Coast competitor, the London, Midland and Scottish Railway (LMS), produced ever-more-powerful express locomotives. The competition was curtailed soon thereafter by the coming of World War II.

British Rail era
In the aftermath of the war, Clement Attlee's Labour Government nationalised the LNER and the other three major railway companies in Great Britain with the passage of the Transport Act 1947, and with effect from 1 January 1948 merged them into British Railways (BR). The ECML came under the control of three of BR's regions; the Eastern Region, the North Eastern Region, and the Scottish Region (the former two were merged together in 1967).

Diesel era
In the early 1960s, steam locomotives were replaced by diesel-electrics, amongst them the Deltic, a powerful high-speed locomotive developed and built by English Electric. The prototype was successful and a fleet of 22 locomotives were built and put into BR service for express traffic. Designated , they were powered by a pair of Napier Deltic engines that had been developed for fast torpedo boats. When introduced into service in 1961, the Class 55's ability to rapidly accelerate and maintain high speed with a heavy train over long distances, immediately cut over one hour from the standard London to Edinburgh journey time, from seven hours to under six. Further improvements to the infrastructure meant that by the mid-1970s, another half-hour had been cut from the journey time.

On 15 June 1965, the first length of high-speed line, a  stretch between Peterborough and Grantham, was completed.

Continuing demand for reduced journey times lead British Rail to introduce a successor to the Deltics, the InterCity 125 High Speed Train (HST) between 1978 and 1979. They operated most express passenger services on the line until electrification was completed in 1991, after which they continued in use on services that run off the ECML and onto non-electrified lines. Generally popular with the public, and considered by some to be iconic, they ran on the ECML for 41 years, before being withdrawn in 2019.

Electrification
There had been proposals to electrify all or parts of the ECML as far back as the early 1900s, but no significant scheme was implemented until the 1970s and 1980s, with the entire line being electrified in two stages between 1976 and 1991. 

Early proposed schemes included a 1904 proposal by the Great Northern Railway to electrify its suburban services from London. A short stretch of the ECML in the Newcastle area was electrified with a third rail in 1904, as part of the North Eastern Railway's suburban Tyneside Electrics scheme. Following the success of this scheme, in 1919 the North Eastern Railway, planned to electrify  of the main line between York and Newcastle; the scheme progressed as far as a prototype locomotive, however it was cancelled on financial grounds after 1923 when the NER was grouped into the LNER, and the new management had no interest in pursuing the scheme. In the early-1930s, studies were conducted into electrifying sections or all of the ECML. 

British Rail's 1955 modernisation plan placed equal importance on electrification of both the West Coast Main Line (WCML) and ECML; a detailed plan drawn up in 1957 gave a completion date of 1970 for ECML electrification. However, the East Coast authorities decided that they could not wait over a decade for service improvements, and instead decided to invest in high-speed diesel traction, the Deltic and High Speed Train, as an interim measure to implement improved services, whilst West Coast electrification proceeded, and was largely complete by 1974. During the period when Richard Beeching was chairman of British Rail, WCML electrification with a spur from Carstairs to Edinburgh was seen as possible justification for the truncation of the ECML at Newcastle.

This was authorised in 1971 for the benefit of London suburban services as part of the Great Northern Suburban Electrification Project, using Mk.3A equipment.

In the late 1970s, a working group of British Rail and Department for Transport officials convened and determined that, of all options for further electrification, the ECML represented the best value by far. Its in-house forecasts determined that increases in revenue and considerable reductions in energy and maintenance costs would occur by electrifying the line. In 1984, the decision was made to commence the electrification of the rest of the ECML to Edinburgh and Leeds. The Secretary of State for Transport Nicholas Ridley and Minister for Railways David Mitchell played a large role in the decision to proceed.

Construction began on the second phase in 1985. In 1986 the section to Huntingdon was completed; Leeds was reached in 1988, then York in 1989 and Edinburgh in 1991. Electric services on the full length of the line began on 8 July 1991, eight weeks later than scheduled. Significant traffic increases occurred in the two years after completion; one station recorded a 58 per cent increase in passengers. The programme also electrified the Edinburgh-Carstairs branch of the WCML, to allow InterCity 225 sets to access Glasgow Central, with the added benefit of creating an electrified path to/from Edinburgh on the WCML from the south.

Included in the structure clearance works were the 127 overbridges that crossed the ECML. Where the existing bridge clearance was insufficient, project managers favoured wherever possible the rebuilding of the bridge rather than the lowering of the track, as the latter requires considerable civil works and can create long-term drainage problems.

Where listed buildings were to be affected by the programme, BR sought approval for its plans from the Royal Fine Art Commission. Through this process a special design of overhead wiring was developed for use on the visually-sensitive Royal Border Bridge, as well as the Croxdale and Durham City viaducts. Elsewhere the standard Mk.3B equipment was deployed.

The electrification was completed at a cost of £344.4million (at 1983 prices, equivalent to £million in ), a minor overrun against its authorised expenditure of £331.9million. Of the total cost, 60 per cent was for the electrification process itself, while the remaining 40 per cent covered rolling stock, including the new InterCity 225 trains procured specially for the route. These were introduced in 1989 to operate express services. They were developed by the General Electric Company (GEC), as the winners of a competitive tender process. The InterCity 225 sets were used alongside other rolling stock, including  locomotives and  electric multiple units. The displaced diesel trains were reallocated predominantly to the Midland Main Line.

The infrastructure supported speeds of up to 140mph, allowing a non-stop run of three hours and 29 minutes between London and Edinburgh on 26 September 1991. As part of testing done to support safe operation the increased maximum speed, BR experimented in 1988 with using a fifth signalling aspectflashing greenon the fast lines between Peterborough and Stoke Tunnel. The flashing green aspect appeared at signals preceding one displaying an ordinary steady green aspect, and authorised running at up to 140mph. Upon encountering a steady green aspect the driver would reduce speed to no greater than 125mph, and thus be ready to react to subsequent signals in the same manner as when driving a lower-speed train. The testing found, however, that drivers couldn't be expected to consistently and accurately interpret and respond to lineside signals when driving at the higher speed, and regulations were later changed throughout Britain to require the use of in-cab signalling whenever running service trains at speeds above 125mph. Nevertheless, and the relevant track Sectional Appendix continued to list the capability to run special test trains in excess of 125mph as recently as 2008.

Privatisation and renationalisation
As part of the privatisation of British Rail in the mid-1990s, passenger operations on the ECML were offered to bidders as the InterCity East Coast franchise. It was held by Great North Eastern Railway from 1996 until 2007, when the company experienced financial difficulties; the franchise then passed to National Express East Coast until in 2009, when it too encountered financial problems and the government was forced to run the franchise itself as 'East Coast'. Another attempt at returning the franchise to private-sector operation was made by Virgin Trains East Coast in 2015, but this failed in 2018, and thus since then it has been run by the public sector through the government's operator of last resort procedure under the London North Eastern Railway brand.

Route alterations
The route of the ECML has been altered or diverted several times, beginning with the opening of the King Edward VII Bridge in Newcastle upon Tyne in 1906.

In the late 1970s in the north of England, the development of the Selby Coalfieldand the anticipated subsidence that might result from its workingslead the National Coal Board to pay for the construction of the  Selby Diversion. Construction commenced in 1980, and was completed in late 1983 at a cost of £63million (equivalent to £million in ). The new section diverged from the original alignment at Temple Hirst Junction, north of Doncaster, bypassed Selby station and the area to be undermined by coal workings, and then joined the Leeds–York line of the former York and North Midland Railway at Colton Junction, south-west of York. The old line between Selby and York was dismantled and is now a public cycleway.

The new alignment takes the form of a gentle curve of up to  towards the south, supported by concrete slabs and other ground stabilisation and reinforcement techniques, and is designed to avoid the need for a permanent speed restriction. It came into use in the last week of April 2003, at a cost of £56million (equivalent to £million in ).

Speed records

World speed records for both steam and diesel traction have been set on the ECML. LNER's 4468 Mallard set the record for a steam locomotive at  whilst descending Stoke Bank on 3 July 1938. The record remains standing today, and a trackside sign was erected in July 1998 at the  milepost to commemorate the achievement.

At least two other trains have subsequently recorded higher speeds, but  the InterCity 125 record remains the highest to have been officially verified.

Future
In November 2021, as part of the Integrated Rail Plan, the DfT announced a major upgrade of the line. The upgrade is set to include major track improvements and digital signalling, leading to higher speeds, reduced journey times and increases in seat capacity. The power supply will also be upgraded to allow longer and more frequent trains.

East Coast Digital Programme 
The last refresh of the lineside signalling system on the southern ECML between London King's Cross and the Stoke Tunnel was commissioned in 1977 and as such was up for renewal between 2020 and 2029. Instead of renewing the current lineside signalling, it was decided to upgrade this section of the ECML to ERTMS in-cab signalling. This will not be the first instance of ERTMS on the UK rail network; it is in use on the Cambrian Line (where it was first piloted), on the Thameslink core Widened Lines route (with an ATO overlay), and on the Heathrow branch of the Great Western Main Line. However, it is the most complex application yet; never before in the UK has ERTMS been used on such a busy, mixed-traffic line, with freight, commuter, regional and InterCity services sharing as little as two tracks in the tightest sections.

Unlike the Widened Lines route and the GWML, where ERTMS complements traditional lineside signals, the southern ECML will have its signals removed once the transition period to ERTMS is complete. This means that all trains running on the route will be required to be fitted with the appropriate onboard equipment. 

The Class 800 series (LNER Azuma Classes 800 and 801, Hull Trains Paragon Class 802, Lumo Class 803), Thameslink Class 700 and Great Northern Class 717 fleets are fitted with ERTMS equipment from manufacture. The Great Northern Class 387 fleet are undergoing retrofit, with the first train sent to Worksop Depot in October 2022. Following its return to service in July 2023, the remaining trains will be retrofitted in Hornsey Depot. The introduction of in-cab signaling will allow the ECML line speed to be increased to 140mph in some places. The Class 800 series trains were designed to reach this speed, but minor modifications will be required to remove the equipment that is currently limiting speeds to 125mph. There are currently no plans to retrofit ERTMS equipment to the InterCity 225 fleet, as they are expected to be withdrawn before the removal of the lineside signals; this means they will never reach their design speed of 140mph (225km/h) in service.

Infrastructure

  
The line is mainly quadruple track from London to Stoke Tunnel, south of Grantham, with two double track sections: one between Digswell Jn & Woolmer Green Jn, where the line passes over the Digswell Viaduct, Welwyn North station and the two Welwyn tunnels; and one between Fletton Junction (south of Peterborough) and Holme Junction, south of Holme Fen. The route between Holme Junction and Huntingdon is mostly triple track, with the exception of a southbound loop between Conington and Woodwalton. North of Grantham the line is double track except for quadruple-track sections at Retford, around Doncaster, between Colton Junction (south of York), Thirsk and Northallerton, and Newcastle. 

The line is carried along its route by a number of bridges and viaducts which are recognised as architecturally significant listed structures; the longest of which is the  Royal Border Bridge at Berwick-upon-Tweed. The  King Edward VII Bridge in Newcastle was opened in 1906, replacing the older High Level Bridge as the main railway crossing of the River Tyne.

Newark flat crossing, where the ECML crosses the Nottingham–Lincoln line on the same level just north of  station, is the only remaining flat crossing in Britain. Plans for grade separating the crossing with a flyover or tunnel, which would increase capacity on both lines, have been proposed on several occasions but are complicated by costs and spatial constraints at the site.  

With most of the line rated for  operation, the ECML was the fastest main line in the UK until the opening of High Speed 1. The high speeds are possible because much of the line is on fairly straight track on the flatter, eastern side of England, through Lincolnshire and Cambridgeshire, though there are significant speed restrictions because of the line's curvature particularly north of Darlington and between Doncaster and Leeds. Speeds on the West Coast Main Line (WCML) were increased with the introduction of tilting Pendolino trains and now match the 125mph speeds on the ECML.

Rolling stock

Commuter trains

High-speed trains

Operators

The line's current principal operator is London North Eastern Railway (LNER), whose services include regular long-distance expresses between King's Cross, the East Midlands, Yorkshire, the North East of England and Scotland. LNER is operated on behalf of the Department for Transport by a consortium of Arup Group, Ernst & Young and SNC-Lavalin Rail & Transit, which took over from Virgin Trains East Coast on 24 June 2018.

Other operators of passenger trains on the line are:
 Great Northern: medium-distance services between King's Cross, Peterborough, Cambridge and King's Lynn and commuter services between Moorgate and Stevenage via either Welwyn Garden City or the Hertford Loop.
 Hull Trains: operates five trains per day between King's Cross and Hull and two per day between King's Cross and Beverley on weekdays, while at weekends there are five trains per day between King's Cross and Hull.
 East Midlands Railway: local services between Grantham and Peterborough, part of the service that runs between Liverpool Lime Street and Norwich.
 CrossCountry: cross-country services north of Sheffield are routed via either Leeds or Doncaster. Leeds trains use the ECML between Wakefield Westgate and Leeds and then again north of York. Doncaster trains use the ECML north of Doncaster. Services run to and beyond Edinburgh. Occasional services run from Doncaster to Leeds before rejoining the ECML at York.
 TransPennine Express: between Liverpool Lime Street and Newcastle, also between Manchester Airport and Saltburn before they divert off the ECML to Saltburn via Yarm and Middlesbrough.
 Northern Trains: suburban services from Doncaster to Leeds and Chathill to Newcastle via Morpeth railway station and infrequent services between Newcastle and Darlington that continue to Middlesbrough and Saltburn.
 Grand Central: operates five daily services between King's Cross and Sunderland, branching off the main line at Northallerton; and four daily services between King's Cross and Bradford, branching off at Doncaster.
 Lumo: operates five daily services between King's Cross and Edinburgh, calling at Newcastle and Morpeth.

Eurostar previously held the rights to run five trains a day on the line for services from mainland Europe to cities north of London, as part of the Regional Eurostar plan, which never came to fruition.

The overnight Caledonian Sleeper operated by Serco occasionally uses the ECML when engineering works prevent it from using its normal train path on the WCML.

DB Cargo UK, Direct Rail Services, Freightliner and GB Railfreight operate freight services.

Development

Capacity problems
The ECML is one of the busiest lines on the British rail network and there is insufficient capacity on parts of the line to satisfy all the requirements of both passenger and freight operators.

There are bottlenecks at the following locations:
 The section of twin track within a four-line section at Welwyn North over the Digswell Viaduct and through the Welwyn tunnels
 The twin and triple-track sections located between Huntingdon and Peterborough.
 Just north of Newark station at a flat crossing with the Nottingham to Lincoln Line.
 The section of double track between Stoke Tunnel and Doncaster.
 The north throat of York station including Skelton Bridge Junction
 South of Newcastle to Northallerton (which is also predominately double track), leading to proposals to reopen the Leamside line to passenger and freight traffic.

Railway operations are vulnerable during high winds and there have been several de-wirements over the years due to the unusually wide spacing (up to 75 m) between the supporting masts of the overhead lines.  The other cost-reduction measure was the use of headspan catenary support systems over the quadruple track sections – as employed in the Weaver Junction to Glasgow Electrification on the WCML during the 1970s.  Headspans do not have mechanically independent registration (MIR) of each electrified road and thus are more complex to set up, compared to TTC (twin-track cantilever) and portal style support structures, during installation. In the event of a de-wirement of a given road, headspans result in the need to correctly set up the OLE of adjacent roads before the line can reopen to electric traction. This was a result of extreme pressure from the Department for Transport to reduce avoidable costs when the line was originally electrified between 1985 and 1990.

Recent developments

 The Allington Chord was constructed near Grantham in 2006, allowing services between Nottingham and Skegness to call at Grantham without having to use the ECML, trains now passing under the line. This provided sufficient extra capacity for 12 additional services between Leeds and London each day.
 Connection of the ECML to Thameslink at Belle Isle Jnc. via the Canal Tunnels as part of the Thameslink Programme (for Thameslink and Great Northern commuter services to extend to Brighton, Horsham and Maidstone East). 
 At the southern end of York station a short length of fourth track was installed in early 2011 at Holgate Junction with accompanying OLE and signalling systems. This work helped to remove one of the bottlenecks on the East Coast Main Line. Previously, trains from Leeds would sometimes have to wait before entering the station. The improvement allows for better flow of trains in and out of the station.
The work was completed by 26 June 2013
 Major remodelling of  station was completed during early 2014 providing three platform faces for services in the up direction towards London and two for ECML services travelling north on the down lines. An additional two platform faces are also available for Cross Country services to and from stations to the east of Peterborough.
 A new flying junction just south of Joan Croft level crossing in South Yorkshire to allow freight trains from Immingham to pass over the line on their way to Eggborough and Drax power stations, was completed in very early 2014. The project, known as the North Doncaster Chord, also replaced the level crossing on a minor road with a new overbridge just to the north of the original crossing point.
 Renewal and gauge enhancement of the Great Northern and Great Eastern Line which runs parallel to the ECML between Peterborough and Doncaster. This removes freight traffic from a heavily congested section of the ECML.
 A new Rail operating centre (ROC), with training facilities, opened in early 2014 at the "Engineer's Triangle" in York. The ROC will enable signalling and day-to-day operations of the route to be undertaken in a single location. Signalling control/traffic management using ERTMS is scheduled to be introduced from 2020 on the ECML between London King's Cross and Doncaster - managed from the York ROC.
 An £8.6million redevelopment of Newcastle station was completed in 2014 enhancing the existing station and provide a state-of-the-art station for thousands of passengers.
 Platform extensions at Stevenage, Grantham, Newark North Gate, Northallerton, Durham and Edinburgh Waverley stations for the InterCity Express Programme.
 Linespeed enhancement on the down slow line in the Fletton area (part of the ECML Connectivity programme) completed in March 2019.
 Additional 130-metre terminal platform on the down side for Hertford Loop trains at Stevenage, with an extra track from Langley Junction, was started in early 2019 and opened for use on 2 August 2020.
 Werrington Grade Separation was a £200million scheme to increase capacity north of Peterborough station by constructing a dive under to route rail traffic between the Stamford Lines and the GNGE line, thereby avoiding at-grade conflicts on the ECML. The project was approved in summer 2018. It was officially opened by the Rail Minister Chris Heaton-Harris on 14 December 2021.

Planned or proposed developments

Over the years successive infrastructure managers have developed schemes for route improvements. The most recent of which is the £247million "ECML Connectivity Fund" included in the 2012 HLOS with the objective of increasing capacity and reducing journey times. Current plans include the following specific schemes:

 King's Cross throat remodelling to improve capacity and introduce higher speed turnouts reducing journey times.
 Power supply enhancement on the diversionary Hertford Loop route
 Additional turnback facility at Gordon Hill (part of the ECML Connectivity programme).
 Re-quadrupling of the route between Huntingdon and Woodwalton (HW4T) which was rationalised in the 1980s during electrification (part of the ECML Connectivity programme). This also involves the closure and diversion of a level crossing at Abbots Ripton which was approved in November 2017.
 Enhanced passenger access to the platforms at Peterborough and Stevenage.
 Replacement of the Flat Crossing at Newark with a flyover (scheme developed to GRIP Stage 2 by Jacobs)
 Upgrading of the Down Fast line at Shaftholme Junction from 100mph to 125mph and higher speed associated crossovers (part of the ECML Connectivity programme).
 Modified north throat at York Station to reduce congestion for services calling at Platforms 9 - 11 (part of the ECML Connectivity programme)
 Freight loops between York and Darlington (part of the ECML Connectivity programme).
 Darlington station up fast line platform and future station remodelling as part of HS2.
 Fitment of TASS Balises and Gauging/Structure works proposed by the open operator GNER (Alliance Rail) to enable tilt operation of Pendolino trains north of Darlington station, supporting its aspirations for express 3hr43min London to Edinburgh Services.

And on a more route wide basis the following projects:

 Power supply upgrades (PSU) between Wood Green and Bawtry (Phase 1 - completed in September 2017) and Bawtry to Edinburgh (Phase 2), including some overhead lines (OLE) support improvements, rewiring of the contact and catenary wires, and headspan to portal conversions (HS2P) which were installed at Conington in January 2018. This will include installation of static frequency converter (Frequency changer) technology at Hambleton Junction and Marshall Meadows Bay area.
The target date for operational ERTMS services is December 2018 with completion in 2020
 Level crossing closures between King's Cross and Doncaster: As of July 2015 this will no longer be conducted as a single closure of 73 level crossings but will be conducted on a case-by case basis (for example, Abbots Ripton Level Crossing will close as part of the HW4T scheme).
 Increasing maximum speeds on the fast lines between Woolmer Green and Dalton-on-Tees up to 140mph (225km/h) in conjunction with the introduction of the InterCity Express Programme, level crossing closures, ERTMS fitments, OLE rewiring and the OLE PSU - est. to cost £1.3billion (2014). This project is referred to as "L2E4" or London to Edinburgh (in) 4 Hours. L2E4 examined the operation of the IEP at 140mph on the ECML and the sections of track which can be upgraded to permit this, together with the engineering and operational costs.
 In June 2020 it was reported that the UK government would provide £350million to fund the UK's first digital signalling system on a long-distance rail route. The signalling is to be fitted on a 100-mile (161km) section of the East Coast Main Line between King's Cross, London, and Lincolnshire, which will allow trains to run closer together and increase service frequency, speed and reliability. No date for when the new technology, already in use on the Thameslink lines at London Bridge and some London Underground lines, has been given.

Accidents
The ECML has been witness to a number of incidents resulting in death and serious injury:

Popular culture

The cuttings and tunnel entrances just north of King's Cross appear in the 1955 Ealing comedy film The Ladykillers. Also during the 1950s, the line featured in the 1954 documentary short Elizabethan Express. Later, the 1971 British gangster film Get Carter features a journey from London King's Cross to Newcastle in the opening credits. During 2009, the motoring show Top Gear featured a long-distance race, in which LNER A1 60163 Tornado, a Jaguar XK120 and a Vincent Black Shadow competed to be the fastest vehicle to travel the full length of the line from London to Edinburgh.

The route has been featured in several train simulator games. Trainz Simulator 2010 features the route between London and York, Trainz Simulator 12 extends the route to Newcastle, and Trainz: A New Era brings it all the way to Edinburgh, allowing the entire 393-mile route to be driven.

King's Cross Station is also depicted as the starting point of the Hogwarts Express in the books and films of the Harry Potter franchise. This connection is marked by a tourist attraction within the station concourse, featuring the Platform 9¾ sign and a luggage trolley partially embedded in the station wall with an owl cage and suitcases on it.

See also
West Coast Main Line
Midland Main Line
Highland Main Line
Great Western Main Line

References

 
Rail transport in Hertfordshire
Rail transport in Bedfordshire
Rail transport in Cambridgeshire
Rail transport in Lincolnshire
Rail transport in Yorkshire
Rail transport in Northumberland
Rail transport in Nottinghamshire
Transport in the London Borough of Barnet
Transport in the London Borough of Camden
Transport in the London Borough of Haringey
Transport in the London Borough of Islington
Electric railways in the United Kingdom
Railway lines in the United Kingdom
Railway lines opened in 1871
Railway lines in the East of England
Railway lines in the East Midlands
Railway lines in London
Railway lines in North East England
Railway lines in Yorkshire and the Humber
Main inter-regional railway lines in Great Britain
Standard gauge railways in England
Standard gauge railways in Scotland
Railway lines in Scotland